Yiannis Mavrou (born 19 July 1994) is a Cypriot footballer who plays as a striker for Karaiskakis.

Career
A product of the Olympiakos Nicosia academy he regularly played as a striker for the Nicosia club for two seasons, as well as for the Cyprus U21 before earning a transfer to AEL Limassol.

External links

1994 births
Living people
Cypriot footballers
Cyprus under-21 international footballers
Cyprus youth international footballers
Cypriot First Division players
Olympiakos Nicosia players
AEL Limassol players
Association football forwards
Ermis Aradippou FC players